FC Mashuk-KMV Pyatigorsk is a Russian football club based in Pyatigorsk.

The club plays in the FNL 2.

History
The history of Mashuk-KMV dates back to the 1920s and the team named Dynamo. The team was known under different names:
Dynamo until 1965
Mashinostroitel in 1966–1967
Mashuk in 1968–1993 and 1998–2002
Energia in 1994–1997
Mashuk-KMV since 2003

Dynamo played in the Soviet League in its first year in 1936, but would not participate in the national competition again until 1966, when the team was renamed Mashinostroitel. After three seasons the team won promotion to the Class A, Group 2. However, Mashuk were not very successful at that level and played in the Second League from the reform of Soviet football in 1971 to 1990, when they were relegated to the Second League B.

After the dissolution of USSR Mashuk played in the Russian Second League in 1992–1993 and in 1995–1997. In 1996 they were able to win promotion back, but after relegation in 1997 Mashuk spent five years at the amateur level. After 2002 season they were promoted to the Second Division, and the runners-up position in 2005 allowed Mashuk-KMV to play in the First Division thanks to the exclusion of two clubs. Mashuk was relegated back to the third level after the 2008 season.

League results

Current squad
As of 22 February 2023, according to the Second League website.

External links
Official website 
Club history at Footballfacts

Mashuk-KMV
Mashuk-KMV
Pyatigorsk
Pyatigorsk
Association football clubs established in 1936
1936 establishments in Russia